The first season of The Cleveland Show aired from September 27, 2009, to May 23, 2010. Production of the 22 episode season began in May 2008 and was expected to begin broadcast in January 2009 but was later pushed back to September 2009.

Cast

Episodes

Reception
The season started off with mediocre to above average reviews. On the series premiere IGN wrote "While it seems to be missing some of the over-the-top offensive bite we're used to on Family Guy, and Cleveland's new drinking buddies aren't quite as amusing as the Quagmire, Joe and Peter combination - there's a lot to like here. It might take a while for the show to grow out of its Family Guy shadow, but with a greater focus on wacky family focused stories, we might get to see much personality burst out of the normally sedate Cleveland."

For the following episodes reviews were generally positive as well. Episode 2 received a 7/10, although IGN mentioned "[the show] hasn't really shown any signs of innovation or desire to stray too far from the well-established Family Guy comedic formula", while the third episode, "The One About Friends", shared similar criticisms such as "This show still seems to be trying to find its way, and without a memorable supporting cast like we have on Family Guy, it will be hard to see how this show can make it with only Cleveland's sedated humor."

On Rotten Tomatoes, the series received a 44%, the consensus reading, The Cleveland Show is simply not interesting enough to capture the same comedic lightning of Seth MacFarlane's Family Guy.

Home media
The DVD was released as a "Complete Season" featuring all of the aired episodes. It was released in Region 1 on September 28, 2010 and was released in Region 2 on October 11, 2010.

References

1
2009 American television seasons
2010 American television seasons